Årnes Station is a railway station located in Årnes in Nes, Norway, on the Kongsvinger Line. The station was built in 1862 as part of Kongsvingerbanen. The station is served hourly by the Oslo Commuter Rail line R14 operated by Vy, in addition to extra rush-hour trains and express trains to Kongsvinger and Sweden. Most commuter trains terminate at Årnes.

External links
 National Rail Administration's page on Årnes

Railway stations in Nes, Akershus
Railway stations on the Kongsvinger Line
Railway stations opened in 1862
1862 establishments in Norway